Tokyo 10th district was a constituency of the House of Representatives in the Imperial Diet of Japan (national legislature) between 1920 and 1924. It was located in Tokyo prefecture and consisted of Tokyo City's Koishikawa ward. Its only representative was Hatoyama Ichirō, the son of former speaker of the House Hatoyama Kazuo.

In previous elections Koishikawa, like all wards of Tokyo city, had formed part of Tokyo Tokyo city district that elected eleven representatives by single non-transferable vote (SNTV). With the introduction of universal (male) suffrage and the return to SNTV voting, Koishikawa became part of Tokyo 2nd district.

Election results

References 

Districts of the House of Representatives (Japan)